Samiullah Khan Niazi (born 4 August 1982) is a Pakistani cricket coach and former first-class cricketer who plays for Sargodha, Faisalabad and Pakistan A as a left-arm medium-fast bowler.

Samiullah Khan Niazi was one of the leading wicket-taker in the 2005–06 Pakistani first-class season with 75 wickets at 18.36. He was a late inclusion for Pakistan's 2006 tour of England, replacing Rana Naved-ul-Hasan. He represented Pakistan when he played two one day internationals against Zimbabwe at Karachi and Hyderabad in 2008. He was also first attack bowler of Pakistan A in Euroasia cup tournament where they beat India in final. He is a genuine left arm swing bowler. He was a member of the Faisalabad Wolves team which won the International 20:20 Club Championship-2005 in England.

In the final of the 2017–18 Quaid-e-Azam Trophy, he took his career-best bowling figures of 8 for 62 in the second innings and his 25th five-wicket haul in first-class cricket. This lead Sui Northern Gas Pipelines Limited to their third Quaid-e-Azam Trophy in four years and he was named as man of the match.

Since his retirement he has become a coach, including being the assistant coach to the Northern U19 Whites.

References

External links
 

1982 births
Living people
Pakistani cricketers
Pakistan One Day International cricketers
Faisalabad cricketers
Khyber Pakhtunkhwa cricketers
Pashtun people
Sargodha cricketers
Sui Northern Gas Pipelines Limited cricketers
Faisalabad Wolves cricketers
Pakistani cricket coaches